Sabine Ellerbrock (born 1 November 1975 in Bielefeld) is a German wheelchair tennis player.  Ellerbrock is the 2013 French Grand Slam champion in Wheelchair Women's Singles.

Tennis career

Ellerbrock played tennis for 25 years as  a non-disabled tennis player. She had a foot infection in 2007 after an operation. She started playing wheel chair tennis in 2009.

2013–Present
During the course of the 2013 season Ellerbrock won titles in Queensland, Adelaide, Nottingham, Salzburg, Gross-Sieghartz, Turin and Sardinia. Ellerbrock was a losing finalist in Paris and Jambes. Ellerbrock reached her first Grand Slam final in Melbourne and despite saving seven match points and coming back from 2–5 in the final set it was all in vain as she lost 5–7 in the third set. However Ellerbrock won her first Grand Slam title at Roland Garros. Ellerbrock was also the runner up in New York. During the season Ellerbrock ascended to world number one after the French Open where she lost in the final but with Aniek van Koot losing in the semi finals this allowed Sabine to take the top spot on 1 July. She relinquished the position to van Koot after losing to the Dutch player in the US Open final in New York.

In doubles competition Ellerbrock was the runner up in Jambes with Montjane. Ellerbrock was victorious in Salzburg and Sardinia with Marianna Lauro. Runner up in Roland Garros with Sharon Walraven and New York with Yui Kamiji.

Ellerbrock began the 2014 season by winning the Australian Open and as a result of van Koot being injured she returned to the world number one position.

Wheelchair Grand Slam finals

Singles: 7 (2 titles, 5 runners-up)

Doubles: 5 (5 runners-up)

References

External links
 
 

1975 births
Living people
German female tennis players
Paralympic wheelchair tennis players of Germany
Wheelchair tennis players at the 2012 Summer Paralympics
French Open champions
Sportspeople from Bielefeld
Tennis people from North Rhine-Westphalia
21st-century German women